The Maggot is the tenth studio album by American rock band Melvins, released in 1999 through Ipecac Recordings. It is the first part of a trilogy followed by The Bootlicker and The Crybaby. The Trilogy was later released on vinyl by Ipecac Recordings (The Trilogy Vinyl, November 27, 2000).

On the CD version, all songs are split into two tracks. A 2006 reissue of the album swaps the background artwork with The Bootlicker.

Track listing

Personnel
King Buzzo – vocals, guitar, bass
Dale Crover – drums, guitar, vocals
Kevin Rutmanis – bass, slide bass, screaming

Additional personnel 
Tim Green – producer
Mackie Osborne – art

References

Melvins albums
1999 albums
Ipecac Recordings albums
Sludge metal albums